Jan Arnold Albert Ketelaar (21 April 1908, Amsterdam  23 November 2001, Lochem) was a Dutch chemist and author of the textbook Chemical Constitution: an Introduction to the Theory of the Chemical Bond. Van Arkel–Ketelaar triangles are named after him.

Ketelaar's doctoral students included Sol Kimel and Robert de Levie. He was elected a member of the Royal Netherlands Academy of Arts and Sciences in 1958.

References

1908 births
2001 deaths
20th-century Dutch chemists
Members of the Royal Netherlands Academy of Arts and Sciences
Scientists from Amsterdam